Estádio Jair Bittencourt is a multi-use stadium located in Itaperuna, Rio de Janeiro state, Brazil. It is used mostly for football matches and hosts the home matches of Itaperuna Esporte Clube. The stadium has a maximum capacity of 12,000 people.

External links
 Templos do Futebol

Jair Bittencourt
Sports venues in Rio de Janeiro (state)
Itaperuna